Joseph LaMoine Jenson (June 27, 1935 – September 2, 2014) was the leader of the Apostolic United Brethren (AUB), a Mormon fundamentalist polygamist group, from 2005 until his death.

Personal life
Jenson was born in Millville, Utah, to Eslie D. Jenson, a member of the Priesthood Council of the Apostolic United Brethren under the leadership of Joseph W. Musser. Jenson grew up in the Salt Lake Valley and graduated from Jordan High School in 1953. Jenson went on to work in the building materials industry and owned the Jenson Lumber in Draper, Utah.

Jenson was a follower of the Apostolic United Brethren practice of Plural Marriage. His wives included, Marillee Thompson, Marilyn Baker, and Joy Rains, and may have included others.

Apostolic United Brethren leadership
Jenson was called as a member of the AUB's priesthood council in 1969 by then head Rulon C. Allred. Prior to assuming leadership of the Bluffdale, Utah church, Jenson had been a member of the AUB's Priesthood Council for 36 years. Prior to the death of AUB leader Owen A. Allred, Jenson was appointed by Allred as the Second Elder of the church and Allred's successor-designate.

Death
Jenson died of cancer at his home in Eagle Mountain, Utah. Jenson had been suffering from cancer for almost five years, which has forced him to abandon the day-to-day operations of his business

See also
List of Mormon fundamentalist leaders

References

1935 births
2014 deaths
American Latter Day Saint leaders
Deaths from cancer in Utah
Mormon fundamentalist leaders
People from Millville, Utah
People from Salt Lake County, Utah
Apostolic United Brethren
People from Eagle Mountain, Utah